Coppin Heights is a neighborhood in the western part of Baltimore, Maryland. Located above North Avenue, it is a working-class neighborhood home to Coppin State University.

External links
Live Baltimore Home Center Neighborhood Description
Demographics from Baltimore Neighborhood Indicators Alliance

Neighborhoods in Baltimore
West Baltimore
Working-class culture in Baltimore